Pari 'Koy  (International title: My Holy Bro / ) is a 2015 Philippine television drama series broadcast by GMA Network. Directed by Maryo J. de los Reyes, it stars Dingdong Dantes in the title role. It premiered on March 9, 2015 on the network's Telebabad line up replacing More Than Words. The series concluded on August 21, 2015 with a total of 118 episodes. It was replaced by Marimar in its timeslot.

The series is streaming online on YouTube.

Premise
Father Kokoy has to leave San Augustine and move to a chapel somewhere in Manila. As he starts his journey, he will get attached to the people and will eventually learn that he has a child "Pinggoy" with her ex-girlfriend, Michelle.

Cast and characters

Lead cast
 Dingdong Dantes as Jericho "Kokoy" Evangelista

Supporting cast
 David Remo as Paul "Pinggoy" Ramos-Evangelista
 Sunshine Dizon as Noemi Espiritu-Cruz
 Chanda Romero as Martha Buenavista
 Gabby Eigenmann as Jude Banal
 Luz Valdez as Esther San Pablo
 Dexter Doria as Salome Marasigan Espiritu
 Jillian Ward as Sarah Espiritu Cruz
 Jeric Gonzales as Eli Marasigan
 JC Tiuseco as Timoteo "Timo" Espiritu
 Carlo Gonzales as Simon Cruz
 Rap Fernandez as Solomon "Sol" Castillo
 Hiro Peralta as Samuel "Sam" Evangelista, Jr.
 Lindsay De Vera as Ava Buenavista
 Jojit Lorenzo as Tomas Sacramento
 Jhiz Deocareza as Japet Lazaro
 Catherine Remperas as Maggie Tadeo-Espiritu

Recurring cast
 Victor Neri as Matthew
 Martin del Rosario as Jeremy
 Spanky Manikan as Manuel Evangelista
 Carla Abellana as Michelle Capistrano-Banal

Guest cast
 Rita De Guzman as Joanna
 Jak Roberto as Omar
 Kris Bernal as Regine
 Mark Herras as James
 Andrea del Rosario as Melba
 Leandro Baldemor as Daniel
 Antone Lingeco as Melba and Daniel's son
 Sheena Halili as Linda
 Mike Tan as Dindo
 Angie Ferro as Josie
 Bon Vivar as Manuel
 Vincent Magbanua as Abel
 Kiel Rodriguez as Jojo
 Will Ashley de Leon as Joshua Banal
 Jayvhot Galang as Rihanna
 Lee Jairus Gulilat as Arida
 Shelly Hipolito as Ruthy
 Joshua Uy as Marky Evangelista
 Ken Alfonso as Ram
 Paul Holmes as Zack
 Alden Richards as young Kokoy
 Jackie Lou Blanco as Kokoy's mother
 Julia Lee as Jezza
 Aaron Yanga as Anton
 Tommy Abuel as John
 Jaime Fabregas as Zachary
 Maricel Morales as Alicia
 Carme Sanchez as Maria
 Michael Angelo Lobrin as Stephen
 Mike Jovida as Nehem
 Barbara Miguel as Daniella 
 Tanya Gomez as Daniella's mother
 Louise delos Reyes as Beth
 Frencheska Farr as Miriam
 Sheila Marie Rodriguez as Nena
 Francheska Salcedo as Mimay
 Marita Zobel as Conchita Banal
 Odette Khan as Delia Cruz
 Arny Ross as Rhoda
 Marco Alcaraz as Bart
 Andrea Torres as Leila Romero
 Nora Aunor as Lydia del Rosario
 Orlando Sol as Joel del Rosario
 Marian Rivera as a pregnant woman

Ratings
According to AGB Nielsen Philippines' Mega Manila household television ratings, the pilot episode of Pari 'Koy earned a 22.4% rating. While the final episode scored a 24.7% rating. The series had its highest rating on August 12, 2015 with a 25.1% rating.

Accolades

References

External links
 
 

2015 Philippine television series debuts
2015 Philippine television series endings
Filipino-language television shows
GMA Network drama series
Television shows set in Quezon City